Glaramara is a fell in the English Lake District in Cumbria. It is a substantial fell that is part of a long ridge that stretches for over six kilometres from Stonethwaite in Borrowdale up to the important mountain pass of Esk Hause. The summit of Glaramara at 783 m (2,569 ft) is the central point of this ridge, which separates the valleys of Langstrath and Grains Gill. However, the ridge has two additional fells, numerous subsidiary tops and several small tarns making its traverse an appealing and challenging walk.

Name
The fell’s unusual and pleasant-sounding name, previously only applied to the summit rocks, has now been accepted as the name for the whole fell. Like many fells of the district the name comes from a series of Old Norse words which in this case is translated as “Hill with the mountain hut by a chasm”.

Topography
Glaramara’s most striking feature is Combe Gill on its northern slopes, a classic example of a hanging valley that was formed by glacial erosion during the last ice age.  The gill is full of crags and according to Alfred Wainwright contains the only natural cave in the Lake District, these are the Dove Nest Caves, a rock slip from Dove Nest Crags has partly covered the cave which has three entrances. On its east and west flanks the fell falls away steeply with rocky slopes and scree to the valleys. To the south the ridge continues from the summit of Glaramara for two kilometres over various tops (some of which are Hewitts or Nuttalls) with little loss of height to the adjoining fell of Allan Crags before descending to Esk Hause.

Ascents
The direct ascent of the fell is usually started from the Borrowdale road midway between Rosthwaite and Seatoller. From here it is possible to ascend on either of the ridges to the east or west of Combe Gill, the east ridge being the best because it allows for the climbing of Rosthwaite Fell and its subsidiary summit of Dovenest Top (632 metres). On this route two other tops of Glaramara, Combe Door Top (676 metres) and Combe Head (735 metres), are passed over. Both of these are Nuttalls.  Combe Head gives fine views down into Combe Gill and from here it is short climb to the twin summits of Glaramara.

Summits
The view from the top of the fell is very good. Glaramara’s position in the centre of the Lake District and its relative isolation from other fells by deep valleys gives a good all-round panorama with the view north down Borrowdale towards Skiddaw being especially fine. Most walkers will continue south along the ridge towards the next main fell of Allen Crags taking in three more subsidiary tops on the way. The first of these is Looking Steads (775 metres) which has Nuttall status, the second is Glaramara South Top / Red Beck Top / Lincomb Head (721 metres) which is a Hewitt and also a Nuttall (called Red Beck Top on the list) and finally High House Tarn Top (684 metres) which is also a Nuttall.

Fell race
The fell is the scene of the annual Glaramara Fell Race which has taken place in April in the past but the 2006 event was switched to July. This is an eight-kilometre (five-mile) race from Glaramara Outdoor Centre near Seatoller to Glaramara’s summit with 640 metres (2100 feet) of ascent. The winner of the race usually takes around 47 minutes to complete the course.

References

External links

Hewitts of England
Fells of the Lake District
Nuttalls
Allerdale